Friedrich may refer to:

Names
Friedrich (surname), people with the surname Friedrich
Friedrich (given name), people with the given name Friedrich

Other
Friedrich (board game), a board game about Frederick the Great and the Seven Years' War
Friedrich (novel), a novel about anti-semitism written by Hans Peter Richter
Friedrich Air Conditioning, a company manufacturing air conditioning and purifying products
, a German cargo ship in service 1941-45

See also 
Friedrichs (disambiguation)
Frederick (disambiguation)
Nikolaus Friedreich

ja:フリードリヒ